GmhB (gene) may refer to:
 D-glycero-alpha-D-manno-heptose 1,7-bisphosphate 7-phosphatase
 D-glycero-beta-D-manno-heptose 1,7-bisphosphate 7-phosphatase